SS Chancellor was a British cargo ship that was shelled and sunk by  in the Atlantic Ocean  south by east of the Fastnet Rock, while she was travelling from Liverpool to New Orleans.

Construction 
Chancellor was constructed in 1895 with yard no. 197 at the Swan Hunter shipyard in Newcastle upon Tyne. She was completed in 1895 and sailed under the name Saint Cuthbert until 1902. She was renamed Chancellor in 1902.

She had a triple expansion steam engine driving a single screw propeller. The engine was rated at 418 nhp.

Sinking 

References 

Cargo ships of the United Kingdom
Ships built by Swan Hunter
Maritime incidents in 1915
Ships sunk by German submarines in World War I
World War I shipwrecks in the Atlantic Ocean
1895 ships
Steamships of the United Kingdom
Ships sunk with no fatalities